New Troy is an unincorporated community and census-designated place in Berrien County in the U.S. state of Michigan. The population was 483 at the 2020 census.

Geography

Mill Road-Galien River Bridge
Mill Road-Galien River Bridge is on the National Register of Historic Places, placed there by the United States Department of the Interior. Galien River Bridge is one of the few remaining concrete camelback bridges in Michigan, according to the plaque.

Demographics

References

Unincorporated communities in Berrien County, Michigan
Census-designated places in Berrien County, Michigan
Unincorporated communities in Michigan
Census-designated places in Michigan